
Gmina Łapsze Niżne is a rural gmina (administrative district) in Nowy Targ County, Lesser Poland Voivodeship, in southern Poland, on the Slovak border.

Villages
Gmina Łapsze Niżne contains the villages and settlements of Falsztyn, Frydman, Kacwin, Łapszanka, Łapsze Niżne, Łapsze Wyżne, Niedzica and Trybsz.

Neighbouring gminas
Gmina Łapsze Niżne is bordered by the gminas of Bukowina Tatrzańska, Czorsztyn and Nowy Targ. It also borders Slovakia.

References
 Polish official population figures 2006

Lapsze Nizne
Nowy Targ County